Oreophrynella quelchii, commonly known as the Roraima black frog or Roraima bush toad, is a species of toad in the family Bufonidae. This species is restricted to the transboundary summit of Mount Roraima in Venezuela, Guyana and Brazil, and to the nearby Wei-Assipu-tepui on the Brazil–Guyana border.

History and etymology
Oreophrynella quelchii was described as Oreophryne Quelchii by George Albert Boulenger in 1895. The description was based on one of the several specimens collected from the summit of Mount Roraima by Mr. J. J. Quelch and Mr. F. McConnell. The species was named for the former.

Description
The holotype, a male, measures  in snout–vent length. Coloration is black, but the throat and belly are spotted or marbled with bright yellow, also described as bright orange with black mottling. Webbing between the fingers and toes is moderate (basal). The dorsum has a high density of tubercles of various sizes.

Habitat and conservation
The species' natural habitats are high montane tepui environments. It is diurnal and usually found on open rock surfaces. It is a common species on the summit of Mount Roraima. There are currently no major threats, although the restricted range of the species makes its vulnerable to stochastic events. Also disturbance by tourists could be a threat. Parts of its range are protected by the Canaima National Park (Venezuela) and Monte Roraima National Park (Brazil).

References

quelchii
Frogs of South America
Amphibians of Brazil
Amphibians of Guyana
Amphibians of Venezuela
Guayana Highlands
Amphibians described in 1895
Taxa named by George Albert Boulenger
Taxonomy articles created by Polbot
Amphibians of the Tepuis